Dürrhennersdorf is a municipality in the district Görlitz, in Saxony, Germany.

Notable people 
 Wolfgang Böhmer (born 1936), politician
 Willi Hennig (1913–1976) biologist and founder of cladistics

References

Populated places in Görlitz (district)